Bookkeeper Kremke (German: Lohnbuchhalter Kremke) is a 1930 German silent drama film directed by Marie Harder and starring Hermann Vallentin, Anna Sten and Ivan Koval-Samborsky.

It was made with backing from Germany's Socialist Party. It was one of two films, along with Brothers (1929), made at the time that espoused the movement's left-wing ideology. The film's sets were designed by Carl Ludwig Kirmse.

It was not a commercial success on its release, generally attributed to its theme and to the fact that it was a released as a silent at a time when cinemas had gone over almost entirely to showing sound films.

Synopsis
After losing his job, a clerk is devastated by the threatened drop in social status now that he is unemployed. However, his daughter falls in love with a chauffeur who encourages her to embrace her new working-class status.

Cast
 Hermann Vallentin as Kremke  
 Anna Sten as Kremkes Tochter  
 Ivan Koval-Samborsky as Junger Arbeiter  
 Else Heller
 Inge Landgut 
 Wolfgang Zilzer

References

Bibliography
 Tim Bergfelder, Erica Carter & Deniz Göktürk. The German Cinema Book. BFI, 2002.
  Bruce Arthur Murray. Film and the German Left in the Weimar Republic: From Caligari to Kuhle Wampe. University of Texas Press, 1990.

External links

1930 films
Films of the Weimar Republic
German silent feature films
German drama films
1930 drama films
German black-and-white films
Silent drama films
1930s German films
1930s German-language films